Renato Cattaneo (16 December 1923 – May 2017) was an Italian footballer. He was born in Como, Rovellasca, Italy on 16 December 1923. Cattaneo died in May 2017, at the age of 93.

References

1923 births
2017 deaths
Italian footballers
Como 1907 players
U.S. Cremonese players
L.R. Vicenza players
S.S.D. Lucchese 1905 players
Catania S.S.D. players
Sportspeople from Como

Association footballers not categorized by position
Footballers from Lombardy